The Hongqi-class (as designated by NATO) or Hongqi 081-class cargo ship is a class of auxiliary ship in the People's Republic of China's People's Liberation Army Navy (PLAN). Seven entered PLAN service in the 1970s; the same design was also used for civilian ships.

The ships are used to support offshore garrison and may transport personnel as well.

Ships of the class

References

Sources

Auxiliary ships of the People's Liberation Army Navy
Auxiliary transport ship classes